The 2023 World Wrestling Championships will held be from 16 to 24 September 2023 in Belgrade, Serbia. Wrestlers will get a chance to win 90 quotas for the 2024 Summer Olympics from the Belgrade Worlds. Any nation which participated in the 2023 continental championships will be eligible to participate in the World Championships.

Medal overview

Men's freestyle

Men's Greco-Roman

Women's freestyle

References

External links 
 UWW Database

 
World Wrestling Championships
World Wrestling Championships
World Championships
Sports competitions in Belgrade
International wrestling competitions hosted by Serbia
World Wrestling Championships
Wrestling